University of Wisconsin–Milwaukee School of Freshwater Sciences (SFS) is an academic division of the University of Wisconsin–Milwaukee focusing on freshwater research and graduate education.

Located at the edge of the Great Lakes, SFS is the only graduate school of freshwater science in the U.S. and the third in the world. It offers Doctor of Philosophy (Ph.D.) and Master of Science (M.S.) of Freshwater Sciences in Freshwater System Dynamics, Human and Ecosystem Health, Freshwater Technology and Freshwater Economics, Policy and Management.

The school was built upon the Great Lakes WATER Institute, a freshwater research institution of the University of Wisconsin System administered by the Graduate School of University of Wisconsin–Milwaukee.

Research centers
 Great Lakes Genomics Center
 Great Lakes Aquaculture Research
 Center for Water Policy
 Public Engagement & Science Communication (PESC)
 The Water Technology Accelerator (WaTA)
 Water Equipment and Policy Center

References

External links
University of Wisconsin–Milwaukee School of Freshwater Sciences

University of Wisconsin–Milwaukee
Water organizations in the United States